The 18th Iowa Infantry Regiment was an infantry regiment that served in the Union Army during the American Civil War.

Service
The 18th Iowa Infantry was organized at Clinton, Iowa, and mustered in for three years of Federal service  on August 6, 1862.

The regiment was mustered out on July 20, 1865.

Total strength and casualties
The 18th Iowa mustered 1127 men at one time or another during its existence.
It suffered 2 officers and 33 enlisted men who were killed in action or who died of their wounds and 1 officer and 131 enlisted men who died of disease, for a total of 167 fatalities.  79 were wounded.

Commanders
 Colonel John Edwards
 Colonel Hugh J. Campbell

See also
List of Iowa Civil War Units
Iowa in the American Civil War

Notes

References
The Civil War Archive

Units and formations of the Union Army from Iowa
Military units and formations established in 1862
1862 establishments in Iowa
Military units and formations disestablished in 1865